Matin Qaim (born 20 December 1969, Mainz, Germany) is the Schlegel Professor of Agricultural Economics and Director at the Center for Development Research (ZEF) of the University of Bonn, Germany. His research focuses on issues of food security and sustainable development. 

Qaim was elected as a Member of the German National Academy of Sciences Leopoldina in 2018 and as a Fellow of the Agricultural & Applied Economics Association (AAEA) in 2019.   In 2021 he became president-elect of the International Association of Agricultural Economists (IAAE) where he will succeed Uma Lele.

Early life and education
Matin Qaim earned his MSc from the University of Kiel in 1996 and his doctoral degree in agricultural economics from the University of Bonn in 2000.  His doctoral supervisor was Joachim von Braun. Qaim did postdoctoral work at the University of California at Berkeley from 2001-2003. In 2003, he received his habilitation from the University of Bonn with his venia legendi in agricultural and development economics.

Career
Qaim served as Professor of International Agricultural Trade and Food Security at the University of Hohenheim from 2004-2007. 
He was Professor of International Food Economics and Rural Development at the University of Goettingen from 2007-2021.  
He joined the Center for Development Research (ZEF) at the University of Bonn, Germany in 2021.

Research

Qaim specializes in food security and sustainable development. He is known for his meticulous analysis of the economics of agricultural biotechnology, connections of farmers to global value chains, and linkages between agriculture and nutrition.   

Qaim argues that higher-yield genetically modified crops can be used to reduce land usage and greenhouse gas emissions from agriculture. He also supports the use of modified crops such as Golden Rice, which has a higher beta-carotene level than conventional rice, as a source of Vitamin A to combat disease. Qaim is a member of the Golden Rice Humanitarian Board.

Qaim recommends a balanced approach to sustainable meat consumption. Pointing out that existing meat prices do not reflect their high environmental cost, Qaim calls for significant reductions in consumption in wealthy countries which have the highest consumption of meat per capita. He personally chooses to rarely eat meat. 

For smallholder farms in poor countries, animals are a smaller and more sustainable part of the food cycle. Increasing the variety of livestock raised and access to markets are both important steps for addressing malnutrition. Increasing the variety of crops grown is not effective if the extra food can't be sold or fed to animals as an alternative to throwing it away. "Keeping goats or a cow, perhaps, in addition to chickens and other animals, can therefore improve nutritional status."

Awards and honors
 2019, Fellow, Agricultural & Applied Economics Association (AAEA)
 2018, Member, German National Academy of Sciences Leopoldina

Selected publications

Books

Papers

References

Members of the German Academy of Sciences Leopoldina
Agricultural economists
University of Bonn alumni
Academic staff of the University of Bonn
1969 births
Living people